Aware is the adjectival form of awareness, the perception of or reaction to an event.  It may also refer to:
 Aware, Inc., a biometrics software and services company
 Aware Electronics, a USA designer and manufacturer of Geiger counters and radiation monitors
 Aware Records, a record label owned by Columbia Records
 Aware (Beanie Baby), a Beanie Baby bear marketed to raise funds for breast cancer
 Aware (album), an album by Salvador
 Aware (voluntary organisation)
 Aware (woreda), a district in Ethiopia
Aware, Ethiopia, a town in that district
 The Aware, a 2003 novel by Glenda Larke
 Aware, also called mono no aware, a concept in Japanese aesthetics
 Aware Magazine, a quarterly publication of Garrett-Evangelical Theological Seminary

AWARE may be the acronym for:
 Project AWARE, a scuba diving charitable foundation
 Association of Women for Action and Research, an NGO in Singapore 
 Americans Well-informed on Automobile Retailing Economics, a nonprofit focused on vehicle finance education
 The AWARE Study (AWAreness during REsuscitation)

Awareness may refer to:
 Awareness (album), a 1971 album by Buddy Terry
 Brand awareness, a marketing term
 Awareness Records, a record label founded by Andy Ware
 Awareness: The Perils and Opportunities of Reality, a book by Anthony de Mello
 Anesthesia awareness
 Context awareness on context with operational context
 Legal awareness
 Location awareness on context with physical location
 Raising awareness